Wolica may refer to:

Wolica, Kuyavian-Pomeranian Voivodeship (north-central Poland)
Wolica, Hrubieszów County in Lublin Voivodeship (east Poland)
Wolica, Krasnystaw County in Lublin Voivodeship (east Poland)
Wolica, Lubartów County in Lublin Voivodeship (east Poland)
Wolica, Opole Lubelskie County in Lublin Voivodeship (east Poland)
Wolica, Bełchatów County in Łódź Voivodeship (central Poland)
Wolica, Piotrków County in Łódź Voivodeship (central Poland)
Wolica, Tomaszów Mazowiecki County in Łódź Voivodeship (central Poland)
Wolica, Bochnia County in Lesser Poland Voivodeship (south Poland)
Wolica, Masovian Voivodeship (east-central Poland)
Wolica, Jasło County in Subcarpathian Voivodeship (south-east Poland)
Wolica, Sanok County in Subcarpathian Voivodeship (south-east Poland)
Wolica, Greater Poland Voivodeship (west-central Poland)
Wolica, Miechów County in Lesser Poland Voivodeship (south Poland)
Wolica, Gmina Busko-Zdrój in Świętokrzyskie Voivodeship (south-central Poland)
Wolica, Gmina Stopnica in Świętokrzyskie Voivodeship (south-central Poland)
Wolica, Jędrzejów County in Świętokrzyskie Voivodeship (south-central Poland)
Wolica, Kielce County in Świętokrzyskie Voivodeship (south-central Poland)
Wolica, Przeworsk County in Subcarpathian Voivodeship (south-east Poland)
Wolica, Pińczów County in Świętokrzyskie Voivodeship (south-central Poland)
Wolica, Gmina Bogoria in Świętokrzyskie Voivodeship (south-central Poland)
Wolica, Gmina Łubnice in Świętokrzyskie Voivodeship (south-central Poland)
Wolica, Gmina Szydłów in Świętokrzyskie Voivodeship (south-central Poland)
Wolica, Gmina Secemin in Świętokrzyskie Voivodeship (south-central Poland)
Wolica, Warsaw West County in Masovian Voivodeship (east-central Poland)
 , district of Kraków
 , formerly a village, now a residential district in Ursynów, Warsaw